is a 2020 romantic comedy manga series written and illustrated by Kobashiko. It follows the secret cross-dresser Kazu, whose friend Masaru walks in on him while he is dressed up, and thinks Kazu has become a woman.

Kobashiko writes the series with themes of happiness stemming from dressing the way one wants, and originally considered writing Kazu as transgender. The manga is released by Kobashiko through their Twitter account since October 3, 2020, and is collected in print volumes by Kadokawa Shoten since May 21, 2021. The series was well received by readers, who found Kazu cute and appealing.

Premise
Josou o Yamerarenaku Naru Otokonoko no Hanashi is a romantic comedy manga following Kazu, a young man who secretly has enjoyed his cross-dressing hobby for half a year. He contemplates how he would like to be called cute and treated as if he were a woman, but how he is worried about someone finding out that he likes being feminine, when his best friend Masaru walks in on him while he is wearing women's clothes. Confused by Kazu's appearance, Masaru misunderstands the situation and asks if Kazu has become a woman like in the gender-swapping manga Kazu likes to read, and calls him cute; Kazu is so happy about it that he begins diligently working on improving his cross-dressing skills further, but keeps getting interrupted by Masaru when trying to explain that he is not a woman.

Production and release
Josou o Yamerarenaku Naru Otokonoko no Hanashi is written and illustrated by Kobashiko. As they enjoy gender-swap stories, they had originally planned to write a story about a transgender character, but decided to instead write about a male character dressing like a woman after deciding that Kazu does not have to be a woman to be cute. They wrote the story themed around the happiness stemming from dressing how one wants, describing it as something they believe is good for the soul, not only for cross-dressers.

The series premiered on October 3, 2020, and is released by Kobashiko through their Twitter account. Publisher Kadokawa Shoten has released the series in print in collected tankōbon volumes under its MFC imprint since May 21, 2021, the first of which includes twenty additional pages of illustrations.

Volumes

Reception
Josou o Yamerarenaku Naru Otokonoko no Hanashi is popular with readers, who liked its protagonist, calling Kazu appealing and so cute that one could forget he is not a girl; the series was ranked by Manga Navi as the tenth most popular manga about male-to-female cross-dressing as of December 2021. Excite News liked the series, describing it as full of cute moments, and enjoyed following the relationship between Kazu and Masaru as it develops.

Notes

References

External links
  

2020 webcomic debuts
Cross-dressing in anime and manga
Japanese comedy webcomics
Kadokawa Shoten manga
LGBT in anime and manga
LGBT-related webcomics
Romantic comedy anime and manga
Romance webcomics
Webcomics in print